The St. Mary's Catholic Church in Purcell, Kansas is a historic Roman Catholic church which was built in 1896. The church is listed on the National Register of Historic Places.

It is located at the intersection of Highways 20 and 137, on the path of the original Pony Express trail from St. Joseph, Missouri to Sacramento, California.

References

Buildings and structures in Doniphan County, Kansas
Churches on the National Register of Historic Places in Kansas
Churches in the Roman Catholic Archdiocese of Kansas City in Kansas
National Register of Historic Places in Doniphan County, Kansas